Robert Lee Brown (born May 21, 1960) is a former American football defensive end who played for the Green Bay Packers from 1982 to 1992, in the National Football League.

Early years
Brown attended John A. Holmes High School in Edenton, North Carolina. Brown was a standout in basketball and football for the Aces from 1974-1978. He earned All-Conference and All-Albemarble as a tight end in 1976. He also lettered in basketball that year where he excelled in rebounding and shot blocking. Before his senior year in 1977, he was asked to switch his position from tight end to offensive tackle due to a lack of size on the squad. He was the captain of his team. He also earned All-Conference and All-Albemarble for the second time. He received Honorable mention All-East. He was voted by his high school most outstanding offensive lineman on the team. In basketball that year he was also voted the Sportsmanship Award by his team for his hard work and discipline. In a 1989 ceremony at his high school his jersey number 73 was retired.

College career

Chowan College
In the fall of 1978 Brown attended Chowan College (now Chowan University) to play football for legendary coach Jim Garrison. He became a starter immediately during his freshman year. During the season, he earned All-Coastal Conference, All Region X and Most Valuable Defensive Lineman on the squad. In 1979, his final season at Chowan College, Brown was Captain of the nationally ranked Chowan defense. He again earned first-team All-Coastal Conference, All Region X and All-America. In 1996 Brown was inducted to the Chowan University Athletic Hall of Fame.

Virginia Tech
In 1980 Brown transferred to Virginia Tech in Blacksburg, Virginia to play for coach Bill Dooley. During his junior year, he earned All-South Independent along with teammates Cyrus Lawrence and Sidney Snell. Brown was MVP in the Oyster Bowl game in Norfolk, Virginia against VMI. He was also voted team MVP and earned such honors as Roanoke Valley Sports Club Outstanding College Defensive player of the year in the state of Virginia. The Touchdown Club of Richmond, Virginia chose Brown as Big Five Defensive player of the year. During Brown's junior season under the tutelage of his position coach John Gutekunst his first game as a Hokie a 16-7 victory against Wake Forest on September 6, 1980. Brown recorded four sacks and led the nationally ranked Virginia Tech defense that season with 61 tackles including 15 of them for losses totaling 105 yards. The Hokies earn a birth after the 1980 season to play in the Peach Bowl against University of Miami Hurricanes. In 1981, Brown was captain of Virginia Tech's nationally ranked defensive squad. He earned numerous honors that year including All-South Independent first team, second team, and Newspaper Enterprise Association (NEA) All-American. Brown played in the 1982 Hula Bowl and Olympia Gold Bowl All Star Games. In 1992 Brown was voted to Virginia Tech Football All-Century team celebrating 100 years of Hokie football. In 1998, he was inducted in the Virginia Tech Sports Hall of Fame.

References

External links

 Jackel, Peter. "Brown withstood test of time ." Packer Report  12 Aug. 2000: Green Bay Packers NFL football . Web. 16 Feb. 2010. <http://gnb.scout.com/>.
 Packers. N.p., n.d. Web. 16 Feb. 2010. <http://www.packers.com/history/record_book/individual_records/service/>.
 Mulhern, Tom. Packer Plus  May 1993: n. pag. Print.
 Remmel, Lee. "100 Robert Brown achieves durability milestone ." Packer Report 28 Nov. 1988: n. pag. Print.
 Hendricks, Martin"Robert Brown's stay was a long one. "Feb 9,2012." www.jsonline.com/sports
 Zeller, Ricky "Brown was difficult to replace." July 13, 2011. www.packers.com

1960 births
Living people
American football defensive ends
Chowan Hawks football players
Green Bay Packers players
Virginia Tech Hokies football players
People from Edenton, North Carolina
Players of American football from North Carolina